42S6 Morfey or Morfei (Морфей after the god of dreams in Greek mythology Morpheus) with missile 9M338K or RZV-MD based and derived from Tor-M2, is a short range air defense system currently being developed for the Russian Armed Forces. Development has been ongoing since 2007 and it is supposed to be introduced in 2015. It is reported to feature an omnidirectional cupola-type radar with Active electronically scanned array. It is being developed by Almaz-Antey.

 This system is designated as a short-range air defense system to protect the S-400 missile system from various threats at their terminal phases, and will also act together with the S-350E as a supplement to the S-400 missile system. Together, these systems form part of the Aerospace Defence Forces.
 Development of Morfey started in 2007. It was planned to be introduced in 2013, however this was delayed until at least 2015. The missile system consists of an omnidirectional 29YA6 radar, infrared sensors and 36 missiles. The missiles have up to 15 km range and an altitude of up to 5000 m.

See also

References

Almaz-Antey products
Close-in weapon systems
Surface-to-air missiles of Russia